Hypoxanthine-guanine phosphoribosyltransferase (HGPRT) is an enzyme encoded in humans by the HPRT1 gene.

HGPRT is a transferase that catalyzes conversion of hypoxanthine to inosine monophosphate and guanine to guanosine monophosphate.  This reaction transfers the 5-phosphoribosyl group from 5-phosphoribosyl 1-pyrophosphate (PRPP) to the purine. HGPRT plays a central role in the generation of purine nucleotides through the purine salvage pathway.

Function 

HGPRT catalyzes the following reactions:

HGPRTase functions primarily to salvage purines from degraded DNA to reintroduce into purine synthetic pathways. In this role, it catalyzes the reaction between guanine and phosphoribosyl pyrophosphate (PRPP) to form GMP, or between hypoxanthine and phosphoribosyl pyrophosphate (PRPP) to form inosine monophosphate.

Substrates and inhibitors 

Comparative homology modelling of this enzyme in L. donovani suggest that among all of the computationally screened compounds, pentamidine, 1,3-dinitroadamantane, acyclovir and analogs of acyclovir had higher binding affinities than the real substrate (guanosine monophosphate).
The in silico and in-vitro correlation of these compounds were test in Leishmania HGPRT and validates the result.

Role in disease 
Mutations in the gene lead to hyperuricemia. At least 67 disease-causing mutations in this gene have been discovered:
 Some men have partial (up to 20% less activity of the enzyme) HGPRT deficiency that causes high levels of uric acid in the blood, which leads to the development of gouty arthritis and the formation of uric acid stones in the urinary tract. This condition has been named the Kelley–Seegmiller syndrome.
 Lesch–Nyhan syndrome is due to deficiency of HGPRT caused by HPRT1 mutation.
 Some mutations have been linked to gout, the risk of which is increased in hypoxanthine-guanine phosphoribosyltransferase deficiency.
 HPRT expression on the mRNA and protein level is induced by hypoxia inducible factor 1 (HIF1A).  HIF-1 is a transcription factor that directs an array of cellular responses that are used for adaptation during oxygen deprivation.  This finding implies that HPRT is a critical pathway that helps preserve the cell's purine nucleotide resources under hypoxic conditions as found in pathology such as myocardial ischemia.

Creation of hybridomas 

Hybridomas are immortal (immune to cellular senescence), HGPRT+ cells that result from fusion of mortal, HGPRT+ plasma cells and immortal, HGPRT− myeloma cells. They are created to produce monoclonal antibodies in biotechnology. HAT medium inhibits de novo synthesis of nucleic acids, killing myeloma cells that cannot switch over to the salvage pathway, due to lack of HPRT1. The plasma cells in the culture eventually die from senescence, leaving pure hybridoma cells.

References

Further reading

External links 
 
 Purine metabolism at genome.jp 
  GeneReviews/NCBI/NIH/UW entry on Lesch-Nyhan Syndrome

EC 2.4.2